Trilokpuri Assembly constituency is one of the seventy Delhi assembly constituencies of Delhi in northern India.
Trilokpuri assembly constituency is a part of East Delhi (Lok Sabha constituency).
Trilokpuri is a resettlement colony of residents which were rehabilitated here when nearby slums were cleared out in 1975–76.

Members of Legislative Assembly

Election results

2020

2015

2013

2008

2003

1998

1993

References

Assembly constituencies of Delhi
Delhi Legislative Assembly